The 2014 Sochi GP2 Series round was a GP2 Series motor race held on October 11 and 12, 2014 at Sochi Autodrom in Sochi, Russia.

Jolyon Palmer won the GP2 Series' feature race, and in doing so, secured enough points to win the 2014 drivers' title.

See also 
 2014 Russian Grand Prix
 2014 Sochi GP3 Series round

References

External links
 

Sochi
GP2